Qaleh Gelineh is a village in Kermanshah Province, Iran.

Qaleh Gelineh or Qaleh-ye Gelineh or Qaleh Galineh or Qaleh-ye Galineh may also refer to:
 Qaleh Gelineh-ye Olya
 Qaleh Gelineh-ye Sofla